Shaun Groves (born December 27, 1973) is an American Christian singer-songwriter and musician from Tyler, Texas.

Early years
Groves became a Christian in sixth grade, and played saxophone in middle and high school; he later attended Baylor University on a full music scholarship.

Musical career
After college Groves moved to Nashville, Tennessee, eventually landing a contract with Rocketown Records in 2000; his first album came out in 2001.

Personal life
He is married to Becky Groves, where together they reside in Nashville, Tennessee, with their children.

Discography

References

Baylor University alumni
American performers of Christian music
Singer-songwriters from Texas
American male singer-songwriters
1973 births
Living people
21st-century American singers
21st-century American male singers